Dahimi-ye Do may refer to:
 Dahimi-ye Do, Dasht-e Azadegan
 Dahimi-ye Do, Shush